Fahadullah Khan (born 18 August 1977) is a Pakistani first-class cricketer who played for Karachi.

References

External links
 

1977 births
Living people
Pakistani cricketers
Karachi cricketers
Karachi Port Trust cricketers
Cricketers from Karachi